Lynn Marie Kirby is an artist, filmmaker and teacher. She currently lives and works in San Francisco.

Biography 
Lynn Marie Kirby was born in 1952 in Washington, D.C., USA. She received her Bachelor of Fine Arts and Master of Fine Arts degrees from the San Francisco Art Institute.

With a background in cinema and conceptual performance, Kirby works with shifting recording technologies, creating film/video hybrids, site interventions and mappings that become records of time, technologies and places. Her improvisational and collaborative projects manifest at the intersection of events and archives, looking at the links between public and private, biographical and historical systems. She has recently collaborated with Etel Adnan, Xiaofei Li, Alexis Petty and Lisa Robertson.

Kirby's interest in the histories of place is closely connected to having grown up nomadically, living in Hong Kong, Libya, Belgium, Sweden and France. Kirby moved to the US to finish her undergraduate education at the San Francisco Art Institute’s conceptually driven sculpture program. While continuing to work in performance, video and installation, she began working in film and completed the MFA film program at the San Francisco Art Institute. Kirby currently teaches at the California College of the Arts where she is a Professor of Graduate and Undergraduate Fine Arts, Film and Interdisciplinary Studies. Her work often incorporates emerging media technology such as using Skype to connect the congregation at Saint Ignatius Church (San Francisco) and the Bay Area art community to the  Sisters of the Holy Cross in São Paulo, Brazil for conversations on social justice, compassion and transformation.

Exhibitions and awards 
Kirby's work has been widely exhibited in galleries and museums, including the Whitney Museum of American Art; the Museum of Modern Art, New York; Olympic Museum, Sarajevo; the Pompidou Centre in Paris; Arsenal in Berlin; Manage in St. Petersburg; Portland Museum of Art; the Kennedy Center and the Corcoran Gallery in Washington DC; LACE and MOCA in Los Angeles, the Pacific Film Archive in Berkeley; the Oakland Museum of California in Oakland; the San Francisco Cinematheque, Yerba Buena Center for the Arts, the de Young Museum, the Museum of Modern Art and Triple Base Gallery in San Francisco.

Her films and videos have shown at film festivals around the world, including Oberhausen, Toronto, London, San Francisco, and Athens. She is the recipient of grants and fellowships from the Guggenheim Foundation 
, Djerassi Foundation, the National Endowment for the Arts, Film Arts Foundation, Jerome Foundation, Kelsey Street Press, and the San Francisco Arts Commission.

References

External links
 Interview at SFMOMA
 Ping-Pong Show Belgrade
 Biography at CCA
 24th Street Mission Listening Project
 An Evening with Lynn Marie Kirby at MoMA NY

Artists from Washington, D.C.
American contemporary artists
Living people
San Francisco Art Institute alumni
California College of the Arts faculty
Year of birth missing (living people)